James Fraser Forbes (1820 – 18 May 1887) was a Canadian politician and a member of the House of Commons of Canada for the riding of Queens in Nova Scotia.

He was born in Gibraltar in 1820, the son of Anthony V.S. Forbes. He worked as a physician and as a surgeon, also serving as surgeon to the local militia, coroner for Queen's County and Health Officer for Liverpool. Forbes married Sarah Jane Jacobs. He was elected to the 1st Canadian Parliament as a member of the Anti-Confederation Party. He became a Liberal on January 30, 1869 and was re-elected to the 2nd and 3rd Canadian Parliaments. He was defeated in 1878, but he was re-elected in 1882. In 1874, he was elected president of the Bank of Liverpool.

Forbes died in Lunenburg in 1887.

His son Francis Gordon also served as a member of the House of Commons. His daughter Sarah was a nursing sister who served with the Canadian contingent during the Boer War.

Electoral record

References 

Anti-Confederation Party MPs
Liberal Party of Canada MPs
Members of the House of Commons of Canada from Nova Scotia
1820 births
1887 deaths
Canadian coroners